Emperor of the North Pole is a 1973 American action adventure film directed by Robert Aldrich, starring Lee Marvin, Ernest Borgnine, Keith Carradine, and Charles Tyner. It was later re-released on home media (and is more widely known) under the shorter title Emperor of the North, ostensibly chosen by studio executives to avoid being mistaken for a heartwarming holiday story. This original title is a homage to the historic joke among Great Depression-era hobos that the world's best hobo was "Emperor of the North Pole", a way of poking fun at their own desperate situation, implying that somebody ruling over the North Pole would reign over nothing but a vast, barren, cold, empty, and stark wasteland.

The film depicts the story of two hobos' struggle (esp. vs. "The Establishment") during the Great Depression in 1930s Oregon. Its screenplay is quite significantly inspired by three separate yet inter-related self-published seminal writings from earlier decades: Jack London's 1907 travel memoir, The Road, and, two lesser-known books, both by legendary hobo "A-No.-1", pen-name of Leon Ray Livingston, The Trail of the Tramp (1913), and his 1917 travelogue, From Coast to Coast with Jack London.

Carradine's character, Cigaret, uses the moniker that Jack London used during his hobo escapades, and like London, is portrayed as a young traveling companion to the older Livingston's A-No.-1 (played by Marvin), but that is where (some assert) the similarity between Carradine's character and Jack London ends, as Cigaret is portrayed in the film as immature, loud-mouthed, and not bright, opposite A-No.-1's gracious and graceful seasoned veteran.

Plot
Shack (Ernest Borgnine) is a conductor on the Oregon, Pacific and Eastern Railroad, during the Great Depression. He guards his train, the #19, against those trying to ride for free. A hobo who is a hero to his peers, A-No.-1, manages to hop the train, and the younger, less-experienced Cigaret coattails him closely behind, only to be seen by Shack, who then locks them inside the car from outside, sealing their exit. Upon realizing their plight, A-No.-1 sets fire to the onboard hay load as a means to exit 'under cover' from the wooden livestock car in which he and Cigaret are now trapped. As Shack directs the crew to stop the train in an approaching rail yard to have yard workers help extinguish the fire and then catch his stowaways, A-No.-1 evades them all, escapes to the hobo jungle, greets his old pal Smile, who, in turn, rouses, and declares to the assembled huddle that "A-No.-1 is "King of The Road, having just arrived on the 19!". Meanwhile, Cigaret is caught by laborers back at the rail yard, who then brags to them that he was the one who rode Shack's train and that the other tramp got them caught and burned to death in the fire. Most of the workers believe him, and they dispatch another "bo" to spread the word back at the hobo jungle that Cigaret is the one who finally beat Shack. When this tramp arrives in the hobo jungle to spread the word, A-No.-1 is there, and is confronted with the story that the young braggart Cigaret is taking credit for his deed. Indignant, A-No.-1 determines to ride Shack's train all the way to Portland to prove that only he is capable of such a bold act. He has another young tenderfoot hobo tag his intention high up on the yard water tower, where everyone can see it. When word of this posting rapidly arrives back in the train shed, Shack is in the process of strangling Cigaret for daring to claim he has ridden Shack's train. Forgotten by the yard workers in their excitement over whether A-No.-1 will succeed, Cigaret quietly slips out unnoticed. The other hobos agree that the first who can successfully ride Shack's train will have earned the title "Emperor of the North Pole." Railroad workers place bets whether A-No.-1 can do it, spreading the news up and down the line by telephone and telegraph, Shack being widely known and disliked.

The next morning is foggy. Determined not to let A-No.-1 board the train, Shack has the train highball in the yard. However, one of the hobos picks the lock on a switch so that Number 19 will be shunted onto a branch linesiding, making it easier for A-No.-1 to board. Then, as the train gets back underway, A-No.-1 unhitches the engine and tender from the freight cars to keep Shack further at bay. Shack yells to A-No.-1 (now hiding back in the foggy woods) that this prank might cost 10 lives when the fast mail train comes through in just a few minutes. A-No.-1 challenges this as merely "a ghost story." Hogger (the engineer), Coaly (the stoker), and Shack desperately get the train going again, and they barely succeed in getting it onto a siding, narrowly avoiding a catastrophic collision with the mail train, nearly giving their dimwitted brakeman Cracker either a stroke, or heart attack from the stress of the near miss.

A-No.-1 re-mounts the train and hides inside a hollow metal pipe on a flatcar. As the morning advances and the fog burns off, he discovers that Cigaret is hiding in the adjacent pipe, and worse yet, may have alerted the #19's crew to their presence by leaving his hat out in the open on the flatcar's open decking. Shack stops the train on a high trestle so that he and Cracker can search for hobos more easily. Realizing that he will soon be discovered, Cigaret climbs down the trestle only to discover that A-No.-1 is already relaxing and smoking a cigar in a junk pile at the bottom of a ravine. They reboard the train beyond the trestle, but Shack notices this, ties a steel coupler pin to a rope, and drags it under the moving train (where it bounces off the passing track ties) to injure them, hitting Cigaret. A-No.-1 grabs the spike's rope, ties it to the car's undercarriage, and urges Cigaret to start climbing up the car with him, but he loses his grip (Shack has sabotaged some of the hand- and footholds) and falls off. Shack strikes Cigaret on the head with a large hammer, causing him to also fall off.

The two men go back to the junk pile and haul several buckets up the slope where they smear the rails with grease. A passenger train is slowed down sufficiently by this such that A-No.-1 and Cigaret are able to jump onto the roof of one of the cars from an overhead sluice. The two jump off at the Salem yard and A-No.-1 uses Cigaret as a foil to steal a turkey. A policeman (Simon Oakland) chases them to a hobo jungle, but is surrounded and forced to humiliate himself by barking like a dog. A-No.-1, by now deeply annoyed by Cigaret's empty boasts, tells the younger man that if he will only listen and allow himself to learn, he has what it takes to become a true hobo, possibly even Emperor of the North Pole. A-No.-1 then gets involved in a local ongoing immersion baptism service as a means of having Cigaret steal a change of clothes for them both.

Back in the Salem yard, A-No.-1 has once again tagged on the water tower his intent to ride The "#19 (train) all the way to Portland". Shack tells Hogger to take the train out of the yard at regular speed, thereby allowing the two hobos to board easily; Shack clearly wants to settle the matter once and for all. A-No.-1 and Cigaret climb aboard the undercarriage of one of the freight cars, where Shack (once again) drags a coupler pin on the end of a rope to injure them. In pain and seeing Cigaret purposefully not helping him despite being helped last time, A-No.-1 uses his foot to throw a lever that releases the pressure in the brake lines, causing the train to stop quickly. Coaly is thrown against the firebox, severely burning his back. Cracker is flung from his perch in the caboose, breaking his neck and dying in the process. Cigaret finds A-No.-1 nursing his injuries near a pond and berates him for lacking the strength and courage to go the distance. The younger man insists that he himself is going to become one of the all-time great hobos.

After this tirade, Cigaret reboards the train, but immediately retreats in fear from the hammer-wielding and very angry Shack. Just as Shack is about to deliver a fatal blow, A-No.-1 appears and begins battling Shack. A desperate struggle involving heavy chains, planks of wood, and a fire axe ensues (Cigaret watches from a safe distance, atop the caboose). A-No.-1 ultimately has the bloodied Shack at his mercy, but instead of killing him, throws him off the train. In defiance, Shack yells that A-No.-1 has not seen the last of him. A-No.-1 then tosses Cigaret off for bragging about how "they" defeated Shack, telling the kid he could have become a good bum but he's got no class. "You had the juice, kid, but not the heart", he yells, as the train rolls away to Portland, beyond the distant horizon.

Cast

 Lee Marvin as A-No.-1
 Ernest Borgnine as Shack
 Keith Carradine as Cigaret
 Charles Tyner as Cracker
 Matt Clark as Yardlet
 Liam Dunn as Smile
 Simon Oakland as the Policeman
 Malcolm Atterbury as Hogger
 Elisha Cook, Jr. as Gray Cat
 Harry Caesar as Coaly
 Vic Tayback as Yardman
 Hal Baylor as Yardman's Helper
 Joe Di Reda as Ringer
 Diane Dye as Girl in Water
 Robert Foulk as Conductor
 James Goodwin as Fakir
 Raymond Guth as Preacher
 Sid Haig as Grease Tail
 Karl Lukas as Pokey Stiff
 Edward McNally as Yard Clerk
 John Steadman as Stew Bum
 Dave Willock as Groundhog
 Lance Henriksen as Railroad Worker (uncredited)

Production
The film was announced in January 1972.

Borgnine's fee was $150,000.

Was the fifth film (of six total) that Marvin and Borgnine appeared in together.

Filming location
The film was shot in and around the city of Cottage Grove, Oregon (also the location used by Buster Keaton for his 1927 railroad feature The General), along the Oregon, Pacific and Eastern Railway (OP&E)'s active right-of-way.  Willis Kyle, president of the OP&E in 1972, allowed the film company unlimited access to make the film, after an agreement with Oregon Governor Tom McCall and 20th Century Fox. Oregon, Pacific and Eastern's rolling stock, including two steam locomotives (one being #19, a type 2-8-2 Baldwin Locomotive Works logging/mining Light Mikado, the other, #5, an ALCO 2-8-0 Consolidation), appear in the film. Also featured in the film is the Dorena Reservoir, located about 10 miles east of Cottage Grove, OP&E's railyard in downtown Cottage Grove, and the former Portland, Astoria, & Pacific Railroad's 1913-built timber trestle bridge over Mendenhall Creek near Buxton, Oregon, now part of the Banks–Vernonia State Trail.

Filming finished on October 5, 1972.

Reception

Critical
Roger Ebert gave the film 2.5 stars out of 4 and wrote, "The movie's energies are vast but never focused; what we’re finally left with is too much undirected violence and some superb direction in an uncertain cause." In 1983 on an episode of At the Movies, Ebert praised this film's train stunts as being similar or "Something he had seen before" while reviewing Octopussy to disagree with Gene Siskel.

Vincent Canby of The New York Times praised the film as "a fine, elaborately staged action melodrama", with "splendid performances" and "almost perfect action-movie characters, people who can't bore us with their earlier histories because they don't have any. They exist solely within the time and the action of the film itself. When it stops, they vanish, but we have had a sensational ride."

Variety found the storyline "limited in scope and insufficient to sustain a full-length feature ... While there is a wealth of violence under Robert Aldrich's forceful direction, the motivating idea is bogged down frequently with time out while Marvin expounds the philosophy and finer points of hobodom to a brash young kid (Keith Carradine) who wants terribly to be accepted."

Gene Siskel of the Chicago Tribune gave the film 1.5 stars out of 4 and called it "a dismal adventure yarn" with "nothing in the script to make us care about either man."

Kevin Thomas of the Los Angeles Times praised the film as "a robust, rollicking adventure yarn" with "one of the finest original screenplays to come out of Hollywood this year."

Gary Arnold of The Washington Post knocked the "gratuitous, cartoon screenplay" and went on to state, "The whole point of the movie is the climax. Without that spectacular, sickening interlude of violence, the project would be completely negligible. The film's success depends on finding more people who are excited than repelled at the prospect of watching Lee Marvin hit Ernest Borgnine with an axe."

Quentin Tarantino later wrote "theoretically Aldrich should have been perfect for Emperor of the North. But instead of the muscular rusty claw hammer type direction you’d expect from the big man, Aldrich gives into corny thirties theatrics. The film seems more like a Damon Runyonesque musical about hobos than the crowbar vs. chain donnybrook that MGM sold it to audiences as."

Rotten Tomatoes gave the film a score of 63% based on reviews from 8 critics.

Box office
The film was a box office failure. Aldrich later said he'll "never understand" why this happened.
I thought the symbols were so clear. It never occurred to me that the audience would miss the relationship – that Borgnine was the Establishment, that Marvin was the anti-Establishment individualistic character, and that Keith Carradine was the opportunistic youth who would sell out for whatever was most convenient. I never thought that people wouldn't root for the Marvin character. I thought everyone would say, "I understand what Marvin is. He's trying not to be regimented and suppressed, and denied his rights, and I'm for him. " And nobody was. It just didn't happen. Nobody cared.

Soundtrack
On June 16, 2008, Intrada Records released the only commercial CD version of composer Frank De Vol's soundtrack to the public, 35 years after the film's release. The CD, limited to 1,200 copies, immediately sold out. Featuring several unused score cues, it was learned that Bill Medley of The Righteous Brothers had originally recorded the vocals for the film's score, but was replaced at the last minute for unknown reasons by Marty Robbins.

The theme ballad, "A Man and a Train", written by Frank De Vol with lyrics by Hal David and sung by Marty Robbins, appears on his album All-Time Greatest Hits (Catalog# 77425), and the CD The Best of Marty Robbins released by Curb Records in January 2006, both featuring a second verse not used in the film.

Home media
The film was released in North America on DVD by 20th Century Fox Home Entertainment on June 5, 2006, under the title Emperor of the North. The Region 2 version was available under general release in the UK from September 3, 2007, under the same title. It was also released on Blu-ray by Twilight Time on September 8, 2015.

See also
 List of American films of 1973

References

External links
 
 
 
 

1973 films
1973 drama films
20th Century Fox films
American drama films
1970s English-language films
Films scored by Frank De Vol
Films based on works by Jack London
Films directed by Robert Aldrich
Films set in Oregon
Films set in the 1930s
Films set on trains
Films shot in Oregon
Films based on American novels
Great Depression films
1970s American films